Guaratiba Biological and Archeological Reserve is a State biological reserve located in the western zone of Rio de Janeiro city, in the State of Rio de Janeiro, Brazil. It protects an important area of mangroves and wetlands in the east of Guaratiba Bay.

Location

The reserve is in the Guaratiba bairro in the eastern part of Sepetiba Bay.
The mangroves cover  and are the best preserved in the state.
The reserve also includes wetlands and modified areas in various stages of regeneration.
There are 34 archaeological sites in the reserve, with the artifacts under the custody of the National Museum.
It remains an important staging point for migratory birds.

History

The Guaratiba Biological and Archaeological Reserve (Reserva Biológica e Arqueológica de Guaratiba) was created on 20 November 1974.
It takes its name from the ibises (guarás) that used to frequent the area.
Urbanized areas were removed from the reserve, while other ecologically important areas were added during the years that followed.

This law assigned the area to the army, which built some housing, now disused.
Further changes to its boundaries were made on 10 December 2002.
On 3 December 2010, it was recategorized as the Guaratiba State Biological Reserve (Reserva Biológica Estadual de Guaratiba), with full protection under the National Conservation Areas System (SNUG).
The reserve is part of the Carioca Mosaic, established in 2011.

Conservation

With this classification, the objective is to fully protect the biota without direct human interference.
The reserve is part of the Atlantic Forest Reserve, declared by UNESCO in 1992.
It is also part of the Biodiversity Corridor of the Serra do Mar and of the Carioca Mosaic, which was created on 11 July 2011.

In January 2011, the State Environmental Institute (INEA) said it planned to build a fence around the reserve to discourage intruders.
When questioned about the effect on local crab harvesters, who had no other means of livelihood, INEA stated that this activity was illegal, but as a temporary measure on a case-by-case basis, some crab harvesting would be allowed.
The goal was to fully eliminate it.

References

Sources

Protected areas established in 1974
Protected areas of Rio de Janeiro (state)
Biological reserves of Brazil
1974 establishments in Brazil